The Mercedes-Benz Zetros is an off-road truck for extreme operations. It was first presented at the 2008 Eurosatory defence industry trade show in Paris. The Zetros is manufactured at the Mercedes-Benz plant in Wörth, Germany. The truck is designed to be compatible with the Hercules C-130 transport and also fits into a standard German railway carriage. In 2019 Mercedes-Benz presented a facelift of the Zetros with a more powerful engine a bigger number of variants.

Variants 
The Zetros is available with an engine power of 360 hp (265 kW) up to 510 hp (375 kW)  in all-wheel drive and non all-wheel drive versions:
 Chassis, Tipper or Tractor
 4x2, 4x4, 6x4, 6x6

Although normally used as a truck, the Zetros has also been put to work as an off-road tractor unit in the middle east. German company Harald Bruhn also introduced a Zetros-based agricultural trailer truck as the Secutor.

Technical characteristics 
The facelifted Zetros has now one type of engine in all variants.
Engine: 12.816 cc inline 6 cylinder diesel

Transmission: 16 speed manual transmission with shift lever, controlled via control cable, pneumatic power-assisted
mechanical differential locks on front and rear axles and in the transfer case
Top speed: 55 mph
fording depths up to 0.8m

Operators

Current operators

Around 2 000 trucks are planned to be produced by the Algeria's National Company of Industrial Vehicles (SNVI) destined for the Algerian defence ministry. Locally further developed into self-propelled artillery systems using the D-30 and T-12 gun systems.

The Zetros is used as a fertiliser spreader in the South East of South Australia.  It is a 4x4 version operated by Crossling Contractors based in Naracoorte.

The Bulgarian army ordered the Zetros in 2009 to transport personnel and supplies. As of 2012, it operates 335 trucks with 30 more on order.

In August 2016 Mercedes Benz has been awarded a contract to provide 330 trucks for the Chilean Army. The contract includes a batch of Zetros 2733 6x6 and Unimog U4000 4x4 vehicles.

The first non military application of the Zetros 2733 was announced in June 2018 by the Costa Rican Firefighters as the organization acquired one. It will serve as transport for rescue crew and equipment in emergency situations as floods, hurricanes, storms, wild fires, volcanic eruptions and earthquakes.

The German army has ordered a total of 110 armoured Zetros vehicles, 72 of which are supposed to serve in logistics units.

Germany donated 20 Zetros 2733 A 6x6 trucks and 50 Zetros 1833 A 4x4 trucks to Jordan in order to be used for the logistics of the Jordanian security agencies when caring for refugees.

Unknown quantity acquired in 2019. Mercedes-Benz ZETROS with Mercedes-Benz EMPL platform for PzH 2000 or Bergepanzer 2 transportation

Mexican Army And Mexican Air Force have planned the purchase of 137 6x6 trucks, in three stages, beginning the first purchase of 46 in 2017. The Mexican Navy also operates an undisclosed number of Zetros trucks.

Finnish Defence Forces has acquired Zetros trucks to replace outdated Sisu Auto vehicles for transportation of both personnel and explosives.

Operated by the Saudi Arabian National Guard.

Turkish Armed Forces use Zetros as HISAR O+ (surface to air missile system) carrier.

Possible operators
 
In 2016, Mercedes-Benz presents and exhibit the Zetros in the Directorate of Arsenals, the plant of the former TAMSE in Boulogne. As reported by the Defensa site, the Argentine Army is a former customer of Mercedes-Benz. The idea is that the Zetros can replace, in a gradual way, the current fleet of Unimog and MB 1114.
 
Royal Cambodian Army will purchase 25 Mercedes-Benz Zetros from RMA Cambodia to replace older Ural trucks.

 

The Canadian Army is currently evaluating the Zetros for their Logistics Vehicle Modernization (LVM) Project.  General Dynamics Land Systems-Canada, Marshall Canada, Mercedes-Benz (Daimler Trucks), SOFRAME, and Manac Inc. have joined together as The Power Team to develop Canada’s Future Logistics Vehicle as the solution for the Canadian Armed Forces (CAF) LVM Project.

Based on a NATO-fielded Mercedes-Benz Zetros Truck, this next-gen logistics vehicle offers unlimited capability based on a common chassis for the Tractor in both Heavy and Light configurations.  Using the Zetros Truck as the basis for the LVM program solution means the chassis and most of its subsystems, as well as the up-armoured ‘swap-out’ cabins, are all more than 90% common.  This means fewer parts, lower training costs, less logistics, and a much lower overall life-cycle cost to Canada than running two completely different fleets.  This offering is being lead by GDLS-C and Marshall Land Systems under The Power Team banner.

References

External links 

Zetros Official Site

Zetros
Zetros